The Suldenbach is a stream located in South Tyrol, Italy. It flows into the Adige in Prad am Stilfser Joch.

References 
Civic Network of South Tyrol (in German)

External links 

Rivers of Italy
Rivers of South Tyrol